

This is intended to be a complete list of the properties and districts on the National Register of Historic Places in Downtown Davenport, Iowa, United States. Downtown Davenport is defined as being all of the city south of 5th Street from Marquette Street east to the intersection of River Drive (U.S. Route 67) and East 4th Street. The locations of National Register properties and districts may be seen in an online map.

There are 252 properties and districts listed on the National Register in Davenport. Downtown Davenport includes 55 of these properties and districts; the city's remaining properties and districts are listed elsewhere. Another 10 properties were once listed but have been removed.

The National Register of Historic Places is the United States government's official list of districts, sites, buildings, structures, and objects deemed worthy of preservation. A property listed in the National Register, or located within a National Register Historic District, may qualify for tax incentives derived from the total value of expenses incurred preserving the property. The passage of the National Historic Preservation Act National Historic Preservation Act (NHPA) in 1966 established the National Register and the process for adding properties to it. For most of its history the National Register has been administered by the National Park Service (NPS), an agency within the United States Department of the Interior. Its goals are to help property owners and interest groups coordinate, identify, and protect historic sites in the United States.

The historic preservation movement began in the city in the mid-1970s with the renovation of several historic structures. A comprehensive study of the city's neighborhoods, districts and architecture began in 1978. The study was conducted in three phases. The first two phases were carried out from 1979 to 1982 and the third phases from 1982 to 1983. The results were published in two volumes. Davenport—Where the Mississippi Runs West reported on the first two phases and Davenport Architecture—Tradition and Transition reported on the third phase. A Multiple Resource nomination was submitted to the National Register of Historic Places that included 12 districts, more than 1,650 buildings on 350 parcels. By March 1985 all the districts and 249 properties were listed on the national register.

The Historic Preservation Commission was established in 1992, and the historic preservation ordinance was passed the same year. Davenport became a Certified Local Government in the state of Iowa. It was now responsible to review local projects participating in state and national preservation programs. It was also able to exercise some control over the modification and/or demolition of historic buildings in the city. The historic preservation ordinance also allowed the establishment of a local register of historic properties. The first four properties were added in 1992. As of 2011, there are 44 properties listed, of which 24 are individually listed on the National Register of Historic Places and 14 are contributing properties in a historic district on the National Register.

Current listings

|}

Former listings 

|}

See also
 List of National Historic Landmarks in Iowa
 National Register of Historic Places listings in Iowa

References

Buildings and structures in Davenport, Iowa